Teigen can refer to

People
 Chrissy Teigen, American model
 Dag Ole Teigen, Norwegian politician
 Jahn Teigen (1949–2020), Norwegian singer and musician
 Jorunn Teigen, Norwegian orienteering competitor
 Obert C. Teigen, Chief Justice on the North Dakota Supreme Court
 Ola Teigen, Norwegian politician
 Ole-Anton Teigen, Norwegian politician
 Teigen Allen, Australian football player
 Tell Teigen, Norwegian acrobat

Places
 Teigen, Montana, an unincorporated community in western Petroleum County, Montana, United States